Josiane Balasko (born Josiane Balašković; 15 April 1950) is a French actress, writer, and director. She has been nominated seven times for César Awards, and won twice.

Career
One of Balasko's most recognized roles among English speakers is as a lesbian in 1995's Gazon maudit (French Twist). She won the 1996 César Award (shared with Telsche Boorman) for best screenplay, and was also nominated as best director. The movie itself was nominated for best film. Balasko's other César nominations for best actress were for Too Beautiful for You (1989), Tout le monde n'a pas eu la chance d'avoir des parents communistes (1993), and That Woman (2003).

1973–1980: The beginning
Balasko began her career in 1973 and was 23 years old when she first appeared on screen, in the short L'Agression, with Patrick Bouchitey. She was in the movie L'an 01, directed by Jacques Doillon. After an absence of three years she returned to the screen in 1976 in the film The Tenant, directed by Roman Polanski, with a screenplay written by him and Gérard Brach. The movie was based on the novel written by Roland Topor.

Balasco career exploded in 1977, with her appearing in seven films over the course of the year. She first appeared in "Solveig et le Violon turc", with Eugène Ionesco and Dominique Lavanant. Then, she played Simone in "Une fille unique" alongside her boyfriend at the time, Bruno Moynot. She made an appearance in Animal, directed by Claude Zidi, on a screenplay written by him, Michel Audiard and Dominique Fabre. It was a big success with more than three million attendances in France, the movie was #5 in 1977 in France. She appeared in Pardon Mon Affaire, Too!, directed by Yves Robert and written by him and Jean-Loup Dabadie. The movie was also a big success with more than two million attending in France alone, and was no.8 in 1977 in France.

She played Nadine in This Sweet Sickness, directed by Claude Miller, based on the novel written by Patricia Highsmith. The movie starred Gérard Depardieu, Miou-Miou, Claude Piéplu, Dominique Laffin and Christian Clavier. She also acted, under the direction of Philippe Monnier, in Monsieur Papa, in which the dialogue was written by Jean-Marie Poiré.

Balasko starred alongside Claude Brasseur, Nathalie Baye, Daniel Auteuil and Éva Darlan. Finally, she appeared (in an uncredited role) in Herbie Goes to Monte Carlo, directed by Vincent McEveety, written by Don Nelson. With almost three millions attendances in France and nearly 30 million worldwide, the movie was a big success.

In 1978, Balasko played in "Si vous n'aimez pas ça, n'en dégoûtez pas les autres", with Gérard Jugnot and Thierry Lhermitte, and in "Les Petits Câlins", directed by Jean-Marie Poiré, alongside Dominique Laffin, Françoise Bertin and Gérard Jugnot. Then, she was in La Tortue sur le dos.

Balasko had the leading role in the comedy "Pauline et l'Ordinateur", for which she wrote the dialogue and where she acted next to Gérard Jugnot, Éva Darlan, Jacques Attali and Marie-Anne Chazel. Finally, she played Nathalie Morin in the cult comedy Les Bronzés, directed by Patrice Leconte, with her friends from Le Splendid, Marie-Anne Chazel, Michel Blanc, Gérard Jugnot, Thierry Lhermitte, Christian Clavier and Dominique Lavanant. The movie was a hit with more than two million attendances.

In 1979, Balasko played Emma-Ammé in one episode of the TV Mini-Series, "Les Quatre Cents Coups de Virginie", alongside Anémone. Then Nathalie Morin again, in the sequel Les Bronzés font du ski with the same cast, which was also a success with more than a millions attendances. She also appeared as a client in the movie "Les héros n'ont pas froid aux oreilles", with Daniel Auteuil, Gérard Jugnot, Roland Giraud, Gérard Lanvin, Michel Blanc, Thierry Lhermitte, Marie-Anne Chazel and Christian Clavier.

1981–1990: directing debut

1981 was very successful for Balasko. First, she played Louise in Clara et les Chics Types. Later, she had the leading role in the very successful comedy Les hommes préfèrent les grosses. The movie was a commercial success. It was directed by Jean-Marie Poiré, who co-wrote the film, with Balasko. After this, she was in another comedy named Le Maître d'école, directed by Claude Berri. This film was also commercially successful, the #9 movie at the French Box Office in 1981. She then played Colette, a supporting role, in Hotel America, directed by André Téchiné, also starring Catherine and Patrick Dewaere.

In 1982, Balasko was in another cult movie, Le Père Noël est une ordure, directed for the third time by Jean-Marie Poiré. The film was commercially successful.

In 1983, Balasko had two comedy hits. Papy fait de la résistance, which was #7 in the 1983 French box office. and Signes extérieurs de richesse, another success.

In 1984, Balasko played a supporting role in the comedy P'tit Con, directed by Gérard Lauzier. She then had the leading role in another comedy, La smala, directed by Jean-Loup Hubert. Finally, she played a supporting role in the comedy La vengeance du serpent à plumes directed by Gérard Oury. The movie was her biggest success of that year. In 1985, she appeared in the movie Tranches de vie directed by François Leterrier. That year she also made her directional debut with the comedy Sac de noeuds, which she wrote, directed and starred in.

1990 onward
Since 1990, Balasko has enjoyed a busy career acting in numerous films in a very wide variety of roles but having an international directing success in 1995 with Gazon Maudit (French Twist), in which she co-starred with Alain Chabat and gained her a César for best screenplay and a nomination for best film. In 2006 she was re-united once again with the Le Splendid team for another Bronzés film Bronzés 3: Amis pour La Vie.

2012–present
In 2018, Balasko record a song with the rapper Mac Tyer on his album C'est la street mon pote.

In February 2019, Balasko received the Crystal Comedy Award during the 4th Festival International du Film de Comédie de Liège to reward her career.

Personal life

Bruno Moynot was her partner from 1974 until 1981. In a second union with sculptor Philippe Berry (brother of actor Richard Berry), she had a daughter, Marilou Berry (born 1 February 1983), also an actress, and an adopted son, Rudy Berry (born 1988). She divorced from Philippe Berry in 1999 and married American actor George Aguilar in 2003, whom she met on the set of The Frenchman's Son in 1999.

In July 2018, Balasko's daughter Marilou Berry announced on her Instagram account that she was pregnant with her first child. Her son, Andy, was born in November 2018 and was Balasko's first grandchild.

Filmography

Actress

Filmmaker

Box-office 
Movies starring or featuring Josiane Balasko with more than one million tickets sold at movie theatres in France.

Theater

Writer
 2004 : Cliente, it became a movie in 2008 directed and starring Balasko, with Nathalie Baye, Éric Caravaca, Isabelle Carré, Catherine Hiegel, Marilou Berry, George Aguilar, Richard Berry and Maria Schneider.
 2006 : Parano express
 2011 : La nuit sera chaude, it became a play in 2011-2012
 2019 : Jamaiplu

See also
 List of female film and television directors
 List of LGBT-related films directed by women

References

External links 
 
 
 
 Josiane Balasko in Barbara's Law on   Eurochannel

1950 births
French film actresses
Living people
Actresses from Paris
French women film directors
César Award winners
César Honorary Award recipients
French people of Croatian descent
French women screenwriters
French screenwriters
Film directors from Paris
20th-century French actresses
21st-century French actresses
Writers from Paris
French women comedians